The Silver Bear for Best Short Film is the second place in the short film competition at the Berlin International Film Festival.

Awards

External links

Berlinale website

Silver Bear Short Film
Short film awards